Ceccy Abena Ampratwum (born 13 November), better known by her stage name Ceccy Twum, is a Ghanaian contemporary gospel singer and songwriter.

Early life and education 
Ceccy was born to the family of Mr and Mrs Andoh in Accra, Ghana. Ceccy Twum started her primary school education at the Don Bosco Catholic Primary and Junior high in Winneba and proceeded to Snapps College for her senior high education in Accra.

Personal life 
Ceccy is married to Prophet Alex Twum and they have three children.

Music career 

Ceccy Twum released her first album Me Gyefo ne Yesu in 2005, which brought her into the limelight. She has collaborated and performed on major platforms with several gospel musicians, including Mercy Chinwo , Joe Mettle, Ohemaa Mercy , MOG Music, Joyce Blessing, Nathaniel Bassey, Sinach , Frank Edwards, Empress Gifty. Ceccy has many hits songs including Victory, Di Wo Hene, Your Grace, Amen.  In 2018 her major hit single Jehovah earned her a nomination at the Vodafone Ghana Music Awards as the Gospel song of the year. She was also nominated for Artiste Of Excellence West Africa at the African Music And Media Awards.

Ceccy hosts an annual Gospel event titled Gold Worship which gathers believers from all walks of life to worship together.

Recordings

Albums 
Me Gyefo ne Yesu (2005)

Meko M'anim (2008) 

Golden Oil (2013)

Awards and nominations

References 

Living people
Year of birth missing (living people)
Ghanaian gospel singers
Ghanaian women musicians